SMJK Sam Tet is a national-type secondary school for boys located in Ipoh, Perak, Malaysia. It is located adjacent to its primary school, SRJK (C) Sam Tet. The school's form 6 classes are available to both boys and girls, with former girls from SMJK Ave Maria Convent, Ipoh being the biggest population of girls. The school was nominated for School of Excellence in 2007 and for Cluster School of Excellence in 2015.

The founder of the school is Father Fourgs from the local St. Michael Catholic Church. During the early stages, the school has survived hardships, including the Japanese Occupation.

History

Early school planning
The history of SMJK Sam Tet is closely related to the progress of its primary school, SRJK Sam Tet, built in 1934. SMJK Sam Tet owes its existence to Father Fourgs from the local Catholic Church. Being displeased with the high percentage of illiteracy amongst the local populace, he organized a meeting with the parish community to discuss the issue at hand. The outcome of that meeting was a plan to construct a Chinese medium school for the predominantly Chinese community. A committee was formed to collect donations and to look into other relevant matters pertaining to said plan. The people showed great interest and responded encouragingly to help in financial matters. Thus, an administrative board was appointed to register the school with the government. Father Fourgs was elected as the first school supervisor under the leadership of Wong Chin Sun as the headmaster.

Pre-World War II 
The first class started on September 1, 1934 with a total of 64 students in 2 classes. In the following year, with an increase in the number of students, the need for more educators increased in tandem. In view of this, the Board of Governors from the local Catholic Church decided to aid in the administration of the school by allocating funds annually.

At the end of the year 1935, Wong Chin Sun retired as the headmaster and was replaced by Phoong Tet Ching in 1936. In the same year, the school had a total of 160 students and 6 teachers sharing 4 classrooms. It was in this year, that Father Fourgs, the founder of the school, died. Father Francis took charge as the school's new supervisor.

In 1940, SRJK Sam Tet decided to build an additional 6 classrooms but the grim grip of World War II on Malaysia forced the project to be put on-hold.

Post-World War II
After the war ended in 1945, lessons resumed and the building project was completed in 1947. The school underwent further expansion three years later with the help of a Catholic school in Singapore. Three Brothers were assigned to the school in 1950. A proper school building for SMJK Sam Tet was erected in 1951.

At the beginning of 1952, three Junior Middle I classes were started under the leadership of Brother Joseph Wong as the principal. An additional three classes started a year later and went into full operation. In 1954, Brother Joseph Wong was replaced by Brother Joche-Chanel Soon, who later founded Maris Stella High School, Singapore.  It was also in this year that the first batch of Junior Middle III students graduated. A total of eight classes were in-service.

In 1955, Brother Marcel was appointed principal of the school. Under his leadership, an additional four classrooms, a science lab and a canteen were built. The school was upgraded to a National Type School in 1958 and the students sat for the L.C.E. examination. It was in this year that Brother Marcel left the school on a transfer.

SMJK Sam Tet continued to progress rapidly under the leadership of Brother John Moh who succeeded Brother Marcel in 1959. He organised several donation drives to extend the premises and purchase sports equipment. His effort paid off with the construction of a new 3-storey building. The school hall was erected in 1970 with the cost of RM200,000. Other facilities such as the library, the staff room and the administration office were included above the hall. The hall was opened by the Yang Mulia Raja Di Hilir Perak Darul Ridzuan on 5 June 1971.

1971 marks the beginning of form 6 classes, with an enrolment of 37 students. Further additions were made to the school in 1973. A 3-storey science block was constructed. The building was named after Ng Song Teik, the brother of Dato’ Ng Song Choon. The ground floor of the building comprises the school canteen. The building was opened by the Yang Berhormat Haji Mohamed bin Yaacob, Minister of Education, on 11 May 1974. In 1976, SMJK Sam Tet celebrated its 25th anniversary. The occasion was officiated by Chan Siang Sun J.P., J.S.M., Deputy Minister of Education.

Due to the student population increased steadily, all its land was exhausted and the facilities were inadequate to accommodate the increasing populace. To meet the demand for more buildings, Brother John Moh, with the aid of the Administrative Board, purchased more land to erect yet another phase of buildings. This new phase was completed in 1985.

In the year 1992, Brother John Moh retired after 34 years of service as Principal of the school. In honour of his services, the school hall was named after him. He was succeeded by Mr Mok Soon Sang who was promoted to the office of principal. Upon his retirement at the end of 1992, Mr Yu Cheng Sun was assigned to take his office. The school continued to expand rapidly with a total of 66 classes, enrolment of 2,423 students and a 137 strong staff.

Developments since 2000
The school website was launched in 2002.

Brother John Moh Hall was upgraded to an air-conditioned hall equipped with a LCD projector. The PA system has also been upgraded. Extensive upgrading works, including the installation of the air conditioner mentioned, as well as an overhead bridge and the expansion of the staff room and library was initiated through events e.g. Jogathon since 2007 and completed before the June holidays ended in 2009.

Near the end of 2014, the hall was upgraded again. The lighting changed into ceiling-mounted lights and the doors were replaced.

During the mid-term holiday of 2015, the hall mounted LED lamps at the corner of the hall, another hall was built on top of the school library for sole usage of the school brass band. The school also rebuilds the classroom floor, staircase and school field during the end-year holiday of 2015.

Name, symbols and missions

School name 

The Chinese name of Sam Tet is 三德, which means "Three Virtues". The three moral values mentioned are:
 信 (xìn) - Faith
 望 (wàng) - Hope
 爱 (ài) - Charity

School emblem
 
 The emblem is designed in 1961 by the fourth headmaster of SMJK Sam Tet, Rev. Bro. John Moh.
 The S and T on top of the logo represents Sam and Tet respectively.
 The stars all around the emblem represents improvement.
 The word 三德 means the Three Virtues, which is Faith, Hope and Charity.

School flag
The colours of the school flag each represent a moral value as described in the name explanation section above.
  - Faith
  - Hope
  - Charity

School song
The school song was composed by Wong Ming Fah, lyrics by Bro. Saw Fatt Lean, written in Chinese. The school song then merged with the primary school song, only the first line was changed.

Achievements

Past year academic achievements 
In 1987 the school achieved 100% passes in the STPM examinations. Out of the 13 students nationwide who scored 5 A's, eight came from SMJK Sam Tet. The years 1991 and 1994, 11 students scoring straight 5 A's in STPM. In 1996, 20 students achieved 5 A's and procured the school a national record. In the year 1998, 28 students scored 5 A's in STPM and SMJK Sam Tet entered the ‘Malaysian Book of Records’ for academic achievement.

Recent academic achievements 
For the PT3 exam year 2015, the school have 18 students from scored 10 A's, 26 students 9 A's and 25 students 8 A's. As for SPM, 6 students scored 11 A's, 27 with 10 A's, 47 students scored 9 A's and 18 students 8 A's. For the STPM, a total of 25 students scored 4 A's and 14 students 3 A's. Compared with 2014, the number of students getting 4 A's and 3 A's has increased from 24 to 39. The passing rate also increased from 86.03% to 90.30%. One of the STPM candidate, Choong Wai Kean, achieved the best overall results in Malaysia. He obtained five principals with a cumulative grade point average (CGPA) of 4.0.

PT3 result for 2015 was superseded by 2016 year's candidates. There were 79 students who excelled in their PT3 exam. 24 students obtained straight A's meanwhile 12 students got 9A's. Moreover, 24 students obtained 8A's and 19 of them received the result of 7A's. In addition, the general passing rate had an increase from 69.3% to 71.8%. SMJK Sam Tet also emerged as the school with the highest number of students scoring a 4.0 cumulative grade point average (CGPA) in Sijil Tinggi Pelajaran Malaysia (STPM) for 2016 in Perak. There are 12 students who scored straight A's, 3 had taken five subjects. Apart from that, the school had also recorded a 100% pass rate in last year's STPM, with all 183 STPM candidates passing the exam.

Other achievements 
On 29 January 2014, A total of 1,000 SMJK Sam Tet students were involved in the 'Longest Chinese Calligraphy (挥春)' program in Malaysia which successfully made it into the Malaysia Book of Records. The work, which contains 4,000 Chinese characters and measures about 2.5 km long, was completed within five days. All of the teachers and students took part in this historical event, marking a huge milestone in the school's achievements. Its words of blessing were meant for the Chinese New Year celebration.

SMJK Sam Tet has made it into the Malaysia Book of Records for the second time when staff and students organised a mass "zongzi" (sticky rice dumplings) making event at their school field on 15 June 2015 in conjunction with the upcoming Chinese Dumpling Festival. A total of 2,015 participants took part in the half-hour-long event, producing 2015 dumplings. Perak State Executive Councillor, Datuk Dr. Mah Hang Soon, who launched the event, said the event promoted Chinese and ketupat cultures.

In 2015, SMJK Sam Tet was branded a Cluster School of Excellence (Sekolah Kluster Kecemerlangan) by the Ministry of Education Malaysia.

Administration

Headmasters

References

External links
 SMJK Sam Tet Big Data
School management system
 Sam Tet Old Boys' Association (STOBA)
 Sam Tet School Alumni

Buildings and structures in Ipoh
Secondary schools in Malaysia
Chinese-language schools in Malaysia
1934 establishments in British Malaya
Educational institutions established in 1934